United Brethren in Christ may refer to:

 Church of the United Brethren in Christ (Old Constitution)
 Church of the United Brethren in Christ (New Constitution)
 Church of the United Brethren in Christ, the evangelical Christian denomination

Or a specific church building
 United Brethren in Christ (Cincinnati, Ohio), a historic church building

See also
United Brethren (disambiguation)